Jose Altagracia Segura Mota (born January 26, 1963 in Fundación, Dominican Republic) is a retired Major League Baseball pitcher. He played during three seasons at the major league level for the Chicago White Sox and San Francisco Giants. He was signed by the Philadelphia Phillies as an amateur free agent in 1981. Segura played his first professional season (in American baseball) with their Rookie league Helena Phillies in 1981, and his last with the New York Yankees' Triple-A Columbus Clippers in 1995. Segura played for the Wei Chuan Dragons from 1995 to 1997 in the Chinese Professional Baseball League.

External links

1963 births
Living people
Bend Phillies players
Chicago White Sox players
Columbus Clippers players
Dominican Republic expatriate baseball players in Canada
Dominican Republic expatriate baseball players in the United States
Helena Phillies players
Kinston Blue Jays players
Knoxville Blue Jays players

Major League Baseball pitchers
Major League Baseball players from the Dominican Republic
Nashville Sounds players
Phoenix Firebirds players
San Francisco Giants players
Spartanburg Spinners players
Spartanburg Traders players
Syracuse Chiefs players
Vancouver Canadians players